Jade Chantel Cole (born June 19, 1979) is an American fashion and print model and former reality television personality. She first appeared on Cycle 6 of America's Next Top Model. She is the founder of Biracial Butterfly Productions, an agency that represents models with biracial ethnicity.

In 2018, Marie Claire named Cole as one of the best 24 contestants of all time on ANTM, ranking her as number six, followed by Pop Culture naming her one of the "Hottest reality TV villains" in 2019.

Early life
Cole was born in Pittsburgh, Pennsylvania, and she is of mixed ethnicity: her father is African-American, and her mother is Dutch. Though her ambiguous ethnicity initially caused her annoyance when people questioned her about it, she learned to use it to her advantage in her modeling career.

Career
Before appearing on ANTM, Cole was a Kindergarten teacher in Philadelphia. In early March 2006, cycle 6 of America's Next Top Model aired on UPN. Cole was one of the thirteen female contestants, eventually becoming the last eliminated in the competition. Joanie Dodds took runner-up and Danielle Evans ended up winning the cycle. During her tenure on the show, Cole was described as "obnoxious, self-absorbed, and flamboyant" and "arrogant... and one of ANTMs greatest villains." E! News called Cole one of the "two biggest bitches in the history of the show." In response, Cole has stated that she felt ANTM was a "misrepresentation", an "inaccurate performance" and that she had been exploited.  Entertainment Weekly included her in their list of favorite contestants and worst makeovers.

Cole stated that she had turned down America's Next Top Model cycle 17, "The All Stars", citing contract issues. In an interview, Cole stated, "As much as I would have loved to be back on TV, I felt I possibly would be misrepresented if appearing on [Season] 17. [It's basically] signing your rights and life hypothetically away... Reality shows frequently portray a modified and highly influenced form of reality. [We're] often persuaded to act in specific scripted ways by off-screen 'story editors' or 'segment television producers,' with the portrayal of events and speech manipulated and contrived to create an illusion of reality through direction and post-production editing techniques."

Cole signed with a number of agencies after her appearance on ANTM, including: Diva Models, based in Singapore; Dream Models, based in Hong Kong; Uber-Warning Models, based in Los Angeles; VMH Models, based in Vancouver; and SMG Models, based in Seattle. She also signed a contract with Elite Model Management.

Cole has partnered with Casa de Amparo, an organization that aims to treat and prevent child abuse and neglect.

Filmography

Television

Music videos

References

External links

1979 births
Living people
20th-century African-American women
20th-century African-American people
21st-century African-American women
African-American female models
African-American models
American people of Dutch descent
America's Next Top Model contestants
Female models from Pittsburgh